GLL may refer to:

 Air Gemini
 Garlali language
 Good language learner studies
 Gol Airport, Klanten, Norway
 Great Lakes League
 Grand Landlodge of the Freemasons of Germany
 Greenwich Leisure Limited
 The Gauss–Lobatto–Legendre or Gauss–Lobatto quadrature scheme